The Story of My Heart is a book first published in 1883 by English nature writer, essayist, and journalist Richard Jefferies.

The book has been described as a "spiritual autobiography" where Jefferies idealises the English countryside as a sort of utopia. The book and its themes have been compared to the transcendentalist movement. Other Transcendentalist themes concerning rapturous union with Nature can be found in the writings of Ralph Waldo Emerson, Henry Thoreau, and John Muir. The scholar Roger Ebbatson considers that the book's "speculative" spiritualism is emblematic of the decline of Christian belief in the more empirical Victorian era.

Reception 
Critical reaction to the book was mixed. A new edition of The Story of My Heart published in 2014 notes that the American conservationist Rachel Carson had two copies of the book at her bedside, but others found the work "barely comprehensible".

References

External links 
 
The Story of my Heart: My Autobiography at the Internet Archive

1883 British novels
English philosophical novels
British autobiographical novels
Novels set in Wiltshire